Cheeseburger in Caseville is a festival that takes place in Caseville, Michigan every mid-August. The festival is a tribute to tropical paradise, cheeseburgers, and Jimmy Buffett. The 10-day-long festival takes place in the August, celebrating the final weeks of summer vacation. Activities at the festival range from sandcastle making to concerts and laser light shows on the beach.

History
In 1999, a Caseville local Lyn Bezemek came up with an idea for an end-of-summer festival that is now known as Cheeseburger in Caseville. About 5,000 people from around Huron County, Michigan attended the first Cheeseburger festival. What  started as a three-day weekend has turned into a 10-day festival that includes concerts, the highlight of the festival, The Parade of Tropical Fools.

In 2004, five years after the debut of the festival, Caseville Chamber of Commerce president Steve Louwers took control. He continues to be instrumental in the success of Caseville's busiest 10 days.

With 2020 being cancelled caused by the COVID-19 pandemic, the 22nd was deferred to 2021.

Parade of Tropical Fools 
The parade is held on the first Wednesday night of the festival and is the biggest attraction that the festival has to offer.  The parade can last up to two hours and attracts more than 100,000 people every year. Fans of the parade are allowed to start setting up their lawn chairs at 6 a.m. the morning of the parade.
. Thousands of beads, candies, Frisbees, and other miscellaneous objects are thrown from the floats each year.

References

Further reading
 "About the Cheeseburger Festival in Michigan". USA Today.
 Backroads & Byways of Michigan. The Countryman Press. 2009. 
 
 
 
 
 
 
 
 "You Have to Hand It to 'The Thumb' in Eastern Michigan". Daily Herald Quote: "...music and notable potables, head for "Margaritaville" (aka Caseville, Mich.) and its 10-day festival, Cheeseburger in Caseville (Aug. 10–19). It is as though Key West had been transported to the North Woods, with more than a dozen..." 
 "Floats and celebrants make their way down Main Street during the Cheeseburger in Caseville Festival Parade of Tropical Fools". Yahoo! News, via Associated Press.

Festivals in Michigan
Tourist attractions in Huron County, Michigan